Tommy Untereiner (born 30 June 1989) is a French professional footballer who plays as an attacking midfielder for Granville.

He has represented Istres in the French Ligue 2, the second tier of professional football. He has also represented Bayonne and Martigues at lower levels of football in France.

2015–16 Coupe de France
Untereiner rose to some notoriety when, on 9 February 2016, he scored the winning goal in extra time for his club Granville as the CFA 2 side beat Ligue 2 side Bourg-en-Bresse to progress to the Quarterfinals of the 2015–16 Coupe de France. The match was televised live, and this led to the video clip of the goal being widely published on the internet.

External links

Tommy Untereiner profile at foot-national.com

References

1989 births
Living people
People from Alès
French footballers
Association football midfielders
FC Istres players
Aviron Bayonnais FC players
FC Martigues players
Ligue 2 players
ES Uzès Pont du Gard players
Sportspeople from Gard
Footballers from Occitania (administrative region)